Wayne Peveto is an American politician. He served as a Democratic member for the 8th and 19th district of the Texas House of Representatives.

Life and career 
Peveto attended Orangefield High School, Sam Houston State University and the University of Houston.

In 1973, Peveto was elected to represent the 8th district of the Texas House of Representatives, serving until 1983. In the same year, he was elected to represent the 19th district, serving until 1985.

References 

Living people
Year of birth missing (living people)
Place of birth missing (living people)
Democratic Party members of the Texas House of Representatives
20th-century American politicians
Sam Houston State University alumni
University of Houston alumni